State Route 321 (SR 321) is a state highway in Lincoln County, Nevada, serving the town of Pioche.

Route description

This loop route connects to U.S. Route 93 (US 93) on both sides via the town of Pioche. Another nearby loop route of US 93, State Route 320, bypasses Pioche altogether and instead serves the Caselton Mine. Within Pioche, State Route 321 serves as the terminus for State Route 322.

Major intersections

See also

References

321
Transportation in Lincoln County, Nevada